Kopri-Pachpakhadi Assembly constituency is one of the 288 Vidhan Sabha (Legislative Assembly) constituencies of Maharashtra state in western India.

Overview
Kopri-Pachpakhadi constituency is one of the 18 Vidhan Sabha constituencies located in the Thane City. It comprises part of the Thane Municipal Corporation and part of Thane tehsil of the district.

Kopri-Pachpakhadi is part of the Thane Lok Sabha constituency along with five other Vidhan Sabha segments, namely, Mira Bhayandar, Ovala-Majiwada, Thane, Airoli and Belapur in Thane district.

Members of Legislative Assembly

Election results

2009

2014

See also
 Kopri
 Pachpakhadi
 List of constituencies of Maharashtra Vidhan Sabha

References

Assembly constituencies of Thane district
Assembly constituencies of Maharashtra